The 1st constituency of Meuse is a French legislative constituency in the Meuse département.

Description

The 1st constituency of Meuse covers the southern portion of the department and includes the prefecture of Bar-le-Duc.

Since 1988 a variety of conservative parties have held the seat with the exception of 1997 when the seat was captured by François Dosé of the Socialist Party who subsequently held the seat at the 2002 French legislative election. Since 2007 Bertrand Pancher has been held the seat first for the Gaullist UMP before he swapped to the more centrist Radical Party and Union of Democrats and Independents.

Historic Representation

Election results

2022 

 
 
|-
| colspan="8" bgcolor="#E9E9E9"|
|-

2017

2012

 
 
 
 
 
|-
| colspan="8" bgcolor="#E9E9E9"|
|-

Sources
Official results of French elections from 2002: "Résultats électoraux officiels en France" (in French).

1